Norman L. Stephens Jr. is an American academic, and the former President of Lincoln Land Community College. Stephens graduated with his Bachelor of Science degree from the University of Florida. He received his master's degree from the University of Florida as well. In addition, he received his doctorate in education in 1971. He began his career in 1968 at St. Petersburg College, and he was the President of Lincoln Land Community College in Springfield. In September 2002, Dr. Stephens was selected to be President of South Florida Community College.

References

External links
 Dr. Stephens Official Bio

Living people
University of Florida alumni
Year of birth missing (living people)